MAS-related GPR, member F, also known as MRGPRF, is a human gene.

See also
 MAS1 oncogene

References

Further reading

G protein-coupled receptors